The Programa Pueblos Mágicos  (Spanish: [pweβloˈmaxiko] listen; "Magical Towns Programme") is an initiative led by Ecuador's Ministry of Tourism (MINTUR). The program seeks to promote tourism in a network of small and mid-sized towns that represent aspects of Ecuador's cultural heritage, and to encourage sustainable economic development in these communities. It is based on the Mexican government's program of the same name.

The network was first established in 2019, with an inaugural class of 5 municipalities. As of 16 March 2021, there were 21 designated Pueblos Mágicos, distributed among 14 of Ecuador's 24 provinces.

List of Current Pueblos Mágicos in Ecuador

See also 

 Pueblos Mágicos (Mexico)
 Pueblo Patrimonio (Colombia)
Pueblos Pintorescos (Guatemala)

References

External links 

 https://servicios.turismo.gob.ec/pueblos-magicos
 https://www.turismo.gob.ec/?s=M%C3%A1gico

 
Ecuador